Sreedevi is a 1977 Indian Malayalam-language film directed by N. Sankaran Nair, starring Kamal Haasan, Sharada, M. G. Soman and Jayabharathi in lead roles.The film has musical score by G. Devarajan. It was remade in Hindi as Rishta Kagaz Ka.

Cast 

Kamal Haasan as Venugopal
Sharada as Sreedevi
M. G. Soman as Chandrasekharan
Jayabharathi as Prabha
Sukumari as Karthyayani
Jagathy Sreekumar as Phalgunan
Thikkurissy Sukumaran Nair as Shivasankara Pilla
Sankaradi as P. K. Menon
Baby Babitha as Sreedevi
Bahadoor as Sudareshan
J. A. R. Anand as Broker
Mallika Sukumaran as Valsala
Master Raghu as Young Venu
P. R. Menon as Sreedevi's father
Pala Thankam as School teacher
Rajam K. Nair as Pankajakshi 
Master Sunil as Ravi

Soundtrack 

The music was composed by G. Devarajan and the lyrics were written by Yusufali Kechery and Perumpuzha Gopalakrishnan.

Release 

References

External links 
 

1977 films
1970s Malayalam-language films
Films directed by N. Sankaran Nair